FAIR Girls (formerly FAIR Fund) is an anti-human-trafficking organization, founded in 2003 and headquartered in Washington, D.C. The FAIR acronym stands for Free, Aware, Inspired, Restored. They currently operate in Bosnia, Montenegro, Serbia, Russia, Uganda, and the United States. NASCAR driver Stanton Barrett is an executive board member and has prominently advertised for FAIR Girls with his cars.

References

External links 
 

2003 establishments in Washington, D.C.
Non-profit organizations based in Washington, D.C.